Omala may refer to:

Omala, Greece, a community in Kefalonia
Omala, Nigeria, a Local Government Area in Kogi State